Roger Sommer (4 August 1877 in Pierrepont, France – 14 April 1965 at Sainte-Maxime) was a French aviator. Born to Alfred Sommer, a Belgian industrialist, Roger Sommer became involved with aviation from an early age. He broke the record for flight duration in 1909. After this, Sommer began working on aircraft construction. He constructed 182 aircraft, making him a pioneer in the field. Sommer was a friend of Roland Garros. Sommer's company, named Sommer, is now a part of Sommer-Allibert. Roger Sommer was the father of former Formula One driver Raymond, and François and Pierre Sommer.

Patents 
 1910 UK patent 13005 (Elastic mountings / shock absorbers)

See also
 Sommer 1910 biplane

1877 births
1965 deaths
People from Meurthe-et-Moselle
French aviation record holders